Infiniti, the luxury marque of Japanese automotive manufacturer Nissan, has manufactured a number of vehicles since its inception in 1989.

Currently produced

Formerly produced

See also 

 Infiniti, the brand under which these vehicles are sold
 List of Nissan vehicles, for a complete list of cars and trucks the Nissan group sells

References 

Infiniti vehicles
Infiniti